Roberto Moreira Aldana (born 6 May 1987 in Luque, Paraguay) is a Paraguayan football forward.  He currently plays for F.C. Motagua in the Liga Nacional in Honduras.

Career
Moreira made his debut in Argentina with Talleres de Córdoba in 2006 at the age of 18 playing against Defensa y Justicia.  After Talleres' relegation in 2009, he signed for Chilean side Rangers de Talca.  He returned to Argentina in 2011 to play for Deportivo Armenio, Club Comunicaciones, Club Sportivo Estudiantes and Ferro Carril Oeste.  He was crowned champions with Estudiantes in 2014 gaining promotion to Primera B Nacional.  In 2018, he signed for Honduran club F.C. Motagua.

Achievements

Estudiantes
 Torneo Argentino B: 2013
 Torneo Federal A: 2014

Motagua
 Liga Nacional: 2018–19 A, 2018–19 C

References

External links
 
 

1987 births
Living people
Paraguayan footballers
Paraguayan expatriate footballers
Paraguay international footballers
Talleres de Córdoba footballers
Rangers de Talca footballers
F.C. Motagua players
Primera B de Chile players
Liga Nacional de Fútbol Profesional de Honduras players
Expatriate footballers in Chile
Expatriate footballers in Argentina
Expatriate footballers in Honduras
Paraguayan expatriate sportspeople in Chile
Paraguayan expatriate sportspeople in Argentina
Deportivo Armenio footballers
Association football forwards
Sportspeople from Luque